Sar Ziarat may refer to:
 Sar Ziarat, Alborz
 Sar Ziarat, Khuzestan